Berezovka is a rural locality (a village) in Kovarditskoye Rural Settlement, Muromsky District, Vladimir Oblast, Russia. The population was 32 as of 2010.

Geography 
Berezovka is located 15 km northwest of Murom (the district's administrative centre) by road. Saksino is the nearest rural locality.

References 

Rural localities in Muromsky District
Muromsky Uyezd